The Kestrel is an individual shoulder-launched weapon system developed by Taiwan's National Chung-Shan Institute of Science and Technology and currently in service with the Republic of China Armed Forces and Coast Guard Administration.

Description 
The launcher is made from fiber reinforced plastic (FRP) and features an optical sight as well as a mount for a night vision scope. Effective range is 400m with HEAT warhead rocket and 150m with HESH warhead rocket.

Development 
Development of the Kestrel began in 2008 following a request from the Republic of China Marine Corps. Eleven tests were carried out between 2009 and 2012 and the Initial Operational Test and Evaluation occurred in 2013. The Kestrel was first exhibited at the Taipei Aerospace & Defense Technology Exhibition in 2013.

Service history

Republic of China Military Police
The Kestrel entered service with the ROCMC in 2015. In 2018 the Republic of China Military Police placed an order for 445 launchers. As of December 2019 the ROCMP had procured 397 combat systems, 238 test systems and five training simulators.

Coast Guard Administration
In 2019 the Coast Guard Administration placed an order for 84 launchers and 88 simulators. By April 2021 many had been deployed to units garrisoned on islands in the South China Sea.

Republic of China Army
The Republic of China Army has evaluated the system to replace their numerous M72 LAW systems. It is a standard Army issue for the Kestrel.

Rockets

HEAT 
The standard rocket features a high explosive anti-tank warhead. The HEAT rocket has a 400m range and can penetrate 35 centimeters of armor.

HESH 
The development of a High Explosive Squash Head warhead began in 2012. It has been tested against brick walls and reinforced concrete. This warhead is particularly effective for making mouseholes (improvised doorways) in concrete walls during urban combat. The HESH rocket has a range of 150 meters and can penetrate 20-60 centimeters of reinforced concrete.

Long range 
A long range rocket that can reach out to 1,200m is in development.

Guided 
A guided missile based on existing Kestrel rockets is under development by NCSIST with an eye to providing a domestic equivalent to the FGM-148 Javelin.

See also 
AT4
APILAS
Mk 153 Shoulder-Launched Multipurpose Assault Weapon
RPG-22
PF-89

External links 
 NCSIST feature video:  (in Chinese)
 NCSIST testing video:

References 

Anti-tank rockets
Weapons of the Republic of China
Weapons and ammunition introduced in 2015